"The First Cut Is the Deepest" is a 1967 song written by British singer-songwriter Cat Stevens, originally released by P. P. Arnold in May 1967. Stevens's own version originally appeared on his album New Masters in December 1967.

The song has been widely recorded and has become a hit single for seven different artists: P. P. Arnold (1967), Keith Hampshire (1973), Rod Stewart (1977), Dawn Penn (1994), Papa Dee (1995) and Sheryl Crow (2003).

Background

The lyrics describe a person wondering if and how it is possible to love again after their first love was lost. "The first cut" of the title refers to one's first love disappointment.

Cat Stevens version
Stevens made a demo recording of "The First Cut Is the Deepest" in 1965, while hoping to become a songwriter. He wrote the song earlier to promote his songs to other artists, but did not record it as his own performance until early October 1967 with guitarist Big Jim Sullivan, and it did not appear until his second album, New Masters, was released in December 1967. He sold the song for £30 to P. P. Arnold, and it became a huge hit for her. Over decades, it also became an international hit for Keith Hampshire, Rod Stewart, and Sheryl Crow. The song has won Stevens songwriting awards, including two consecutive ASCAP songwriting awards for "Songwriter of the Year" in 2005 and 2006.

Personnel
Cat Stevens – lead and backing vocals, acoustic guitar, piano
Big Jim Sullivan – electric guitar
Herbie Flowers – bass guitar
Chris Hunt – drums

P. P. Arnold version
American expatriate singer P. P. Arnold had the first hit with the song, reaching No. 18 on the UK Singles Chart with her version in May 1967, well ahead of the song appearing on Stevens' album. The Arnold hit featured an up-tempo, soulful vocal set against harpsichord, horns, and strings. It also appeared in the 2012 feature film Seven Psychopaths.

Norma Fraser version
Jamaican singer Norma Fraser covered the song in 1967 on a Studio One recording released as the A side of the Coxsone label 45 rpm disc CS 7017. Fraser's version was subsequently released on various Studio One compilation LPs and CDs.

Keith Hampshire version
Keith Hampshire had the first chart-topping hit of the song when his recording of it became a number-one hit in Canada in 1973, reaching the top of the RPM 100 national singles chart on 12 May of that year. It also topped the Canadian Adult Contemporary chart and charted in the United States, albeit outside the top 40.

Charts

Weekly charts

Year-end charts

Rod Stewart version

Stewart recorded the song at Muscle Shoals Sound Studio in Sheffield, Alabama, United States, and it appeared on his 1976 album A Night on the Town. It was released as a double A-side single with "I Don't Want to Talk About It". It was a huge success, and spent four weeks at No. 1 on the UK Singles Chart in May 1977, No. 11 in April in Canada, and also reached No. 21 on the Billboard Hot 100 in the U.S. In a departure from the original, Stewart excludes the concluding "But when it comes to being loved, she's first" from the refrain. In 1993, he recorded a live version during a session of MTV Unplugged. This was included on the album Unplugged...and Seated.

Record World called it a "love ballad, this time penned by Cat Stevens back in the sixties. Watch for another rapid chart ascent."

Charts

Weekly charts

Year-end charts

Papa Dee version

Swedish musician Papa Dee released a reggae cover of "The First Cut Is the Deepest" in 1995. It was released as the first single from his fourth album, The Journey (1996), and remains his most commercially successful track. Scoring chart success in Europe, it peaked at No. 5 in Sweden, No. 9 in Denmark and Norway, No. 20 in Austria, and No. 38 in Iceland.

Critical reception
Pan-European magazine Music & Media wrote, "Dee-lightfully our Swedish Papa tackles the old Cat Stevens hit in a pop dance-infused reggae style with a snappy ragga interlude. Radio, club and dub edits are available too."

Track listings

Charts

Weekly charts

Year-end charts

Sheryl Crow version

Sheryl Crow's version of "The First Cut Is the Deepest" is the first single released from her 2003 compilation album The Very Best of Sheryl Crow. It became one of Crow's biggest radio hits, peaking at No. 14 on the US Billboard Hot 100 and becoming her first solo top-40 country hit following the success of her duet with Kid Rock, "Picture". The song stayed on the Hot 100 for 36 weeks and became a gold seller, also reaching No. 1 on the Billboard Adult Contemporary and Adult Top 40 charts. Internationally, the song was a top-twenty success in Hungary, Ireland and New Zealand.

Music video
The Sheryl Crow music video for "The First Cut Is the Deepest" was directed by Wayne Isham with art direction by Andrew Elias. Filmed in southern Utah, the video features Sheryl in a rocky desert singing with her guitar, riding horses and interacting in a cowboy environment. Sheryl's single was nominated for a Best Female Pop Vocal Performance at the Grammy Awards, losing to "Sunrise" by Norah Jones.

Charts

Weekly charts

Year-end charts

Certifications

Release history

See also
List of Billboard Adult Contemporary number ones of 2004

References

1967 singles
1967 songs
1977 singles
1995 singles
2003 singles
A&M Records singles
Cat Stevens songs
Immediate Records singles
Music videos directed by Bruce Gowers
Music videos directed by Wayne Isham
Riva Records singles
Rod Stewart songs
RPM Top Singles number-one singles
Sheryl Crow songs
Song recordings produced by Mike Hurst (producer)
Song recordings produced by Tom Dowd
Songs written by Cat Stevens
UK Singles Chart number-one singles
Warner Music Group singles
Warner Records singles